David Williams (9 February 1900 – 1978) was a Welsh historian.

Williams was born at Llan-y-Cefn, Pembrokeshire.

From 1945 until his retirement in 1967, Williams was Professor of Welsh History in the University of Wales.  He is best known for his classic History of Modern Wales.

Works
History of Modern Wales (1950)
The Rebecca Riots (1955)

References

1900 births
1978 deaths
20th-century Welsh historians
Academics of the University of Wales
Historians of Wales